

United States

United States territories

References

See also
Shinto
Shinto shrine
List of Shinto shrines
Buddhist Churches of America
Honpa Hongwanji Mission of Hawaii
Hawaii Shingon Mission
Gedatsu Church of America

Shinto shrines
United States